The Ilford North by-election of 3 February 1954 was held after the resignation of Conservative MP Geoffrey Hutchinson, who gave up his seat to become chairman of the National Assistance Board. He subsequently became Baron Ilford. The seat was retained for the Conservatives by Tom Iremonger, who held the seat at the General Election the following year, and who remained the constituency's MP until defeated at the October 1974 election.

Results

See also
1978 Ilford North by-election
1920 Ilford by-election

External links
Full results

References

Ilford North by-election
Ilford North,1954
Ilford North,1954
Ilford North by-election
Ilford North,1954
1950s in Essex
Ilford